Zainsk Reservoir or Zay Reservoir is a reservoir of the Zay River near Zainsk, Tatarstan, Russian Federation. It was filled in 1963 to be a cooling pond for Zainsk TTP. It has surface area 20.5 km², a length 12 km, mean width 1.7 km, mean depth 3.1 m  and a volume 63 million cubic meters.

Reservoirs in Russia
Reservoirs in Tatarstan
Cooling ponds